The Ashbourne Baseball Club is Ireland's largest baseball club. It is located in Ashbourne, County Meath, and draws players from the surrounding area, including Dublin. The club was created in 2009 as the Garristown Gruffalos.  The club competes in the Irish Baseball League and plays in the International Baseball Centre.

History

The Ashbourne Baseball Club was formed as a Little League team (“Garristown Gruffalos") in 2009.  In 2012, the club relocated to Ashbourne, County Meath to become the Ashbourne Giants.

The club competed solely as a little league club until 2014, when the club entered its first adult team in the B Division of the Irish Baseball League. In 2018, the club entered a second adult team in the A Division of the Irish Baseball League. In 2019, the club entered a second team in the B division, the Ashbourne Stags. In 2020, the club created its first adult coed slow pitch softball team, the Ashbourne Antlers.

Baseball divisions

"Coach Pitch" is the club's youngest age group, for kids under 10. The little League program is for kids aged 9–12. Players 13 and 14 join the club's "Cadet Baseball" program.

The club has two teams in the B division of the Irish Baseball League, the Ashbourne Giants and Ashbourne Stags. The "Ashbourne Giants B"  and the "Ashbourne Titans" teams are focused on youth development. The "Ashbourne Stags" team is the home of adult players of all abilities and experience levels. The "Ashbourne Giants A" division team is made up of the best players in the club and competes at the highest levels in the Irish Baseball League.

Facilities

The International Baseball Centre (IBC) is the home field of the Ashbourne Baseball Club.  It opened in 2015. The IBC is also the host field for the International Baseball Festival, an annual international baseball tournament held in Ashbourne. The IBC was also the host field for the 2019 European Baseball Championship - Qualification, which was held in Ireland in 2018.

Championships

 Baseball Ireland Little League Champions (3): 2015, 2016, 2017
 Baseball Ireland Cadet League Champions (1): 2021
 Baseball Ireland B Division Regular Season Champions (1): 2017
 Baseball Ireland B Division Champions (2): 2017, 2020
 Baseball Ireland A Division Regular Season Champions(1) 2021
 Baseball Ireland A Division Champions (1): 2022

References

External links 
 Ashbourne Baseball Club
 Baseball Ireland - Clubs

Irish Baseball League
Baseball in Ireland
2009 establishments in Ireland
Baseball teams in Ireland